Erwin Coolidge "Bob" Porterfield (August 10, 1923 – April 28, 1980) was a right-handed Major League Baseball pitcher. He played for twelve seasons between 1948 and 1959 for the New York Yankees, Washington Senators, Boston Red Sox, Pittsburgh Pirates and Chicago Cubs. He appeared in one All-Star game in his career.

New York Yankees
Originally signed by the Yankees in 1946, it did not take him long to reach the Major Leagues. He made his debut on August 8, 1948 at the age of 24. He showed some promise in his rookie season, going 5–3 with a 4.50 ERA in 78 innings of work. Although he walked 34 and struck out only 30 batters, he threw only one wild pitch in that time so his control must not have been too much of a concern. While in the minors in 1948, he led the International League in ERA.

He spent the next couple years with the Yankees, never playing a full season with them. In his time with them, he wore the number 18, except in 1951, he wore 23.

Washington Senators
On June 15, 1951, he was sent with Tom Ferrick and Fred Sanford to the Senators for Bob Kuzava. The Senators would end up getting the better of the deal. In less than three seasons with the Yankees, Kuzava would go 15–19 as a starter/reliever. In contrast, Ferrick went 6–3 with a 2.73 ERA in 49 relief appearances with the Senators. Although Stanford did not amount to much, Bob Porterfield was the gem of the trade. In 1952, he posted a mediocre 13–14 record, but he did post solid 2.72 ERA, which was good for seventh in the league.

In 1953, he led the league with 22 wins and was tenth in the league with a 3.35 ERA. He was seventh in the league in MVP voting and was named The Sporting News Pitcher of the Year. He led the league with 24 complete games and 9 shutouts and was also involved in a triple play on May 22. He threw two one-hitters in 1953. Oddly, this season was not his lone All-Star season.

Despite his successful year in 1953, Porterfield signed only an $18,000 contract in 1954. Detroit pitcher Ned Garver recalled the effect this had on other pitchers' salaries. "If twenty two wins was worth $18,000 - then what we did was worth a lot less." 1954 would be Porterfield's lone All-Star year. He posted a mediocre 13–15 record, leading the league in hits allowed with 249. He did lead the league in complete games with 21, but obviously 1953 was far more All-Star worthy than 1954. In his appearance in the All-Star Game, he allowed one home run to Ted Kluszewski.

After his three successful seasons in which he averaged a record of 15–13, and posted a cumulative 3.14 ERA, his career quickly spiraled downward. His 10-17 record and 4.45 ERA in 1955 prompted the Senators to trade him (along with Johnny Schmitz, Tom Umphlett, and Mickey Vernon) to the Red Sox for Karl Olson, Dick Brodowski, Tex Clevenger, Neil Chrisley, and Al Curtis (a minor leaguer) on November 8 of that year. While with the Senators, he wore the number 19, except in 1951, where he wore 29.

Boston Red Sox
His statistics did not improve while with the Red Sox. In fact, in just over two years with the Red Sox, he posted a 7 and 16 record with an ERA of 4.65. After pitching only two games with the Red Sox in the 1958 season, the Pirates purchased him. In his time with the Red Sox, he wore number 19, except in 1956, where he wore 16 and 20.

Pittsburgh Pirates
He actually did fairly well with the Pirates in 1958—in 37 appearances (only six starts), he posted a less-than-stellar 4–6 record, but his ERA was a solid 3.29. He surrendered only 78 hits in 87 innings with the Bucs. He won quite a pitching duel with Curt Simmons, earning the victory in a 1–0, 11 inning bout with the Philadelphia Phillies. He was involved in another interesting game in 1958 as well—on July 23, "Dodger Norm Larker hits a ball just inside the 1B line, which the Pirates believe to be foul. When umpire Vic Delmore signals it fair, P Bob Porterfield picks up the ball from where it had rolled into the bullpen. Though not playing, Porterfield is ejected for intentional interference with a ball in play. Larker is safe on 2B. The Dodgers still lose 11–3 in the doubleheader opener and are now in last place."

1959 was an interesting year for Porterfield. He started off the season with the Pirates, pitching six games with them, posting a small ERA of 1.69. Nevertheless, the Pirates released him, and the Cubs picked him up. With them, he pitched four games, posting an 11.37 in that time. He was then selected off waivers from the Cubs by the Pirates, the team he started the season with. This go-around with the Bucs was not so successful. In 30 relief appearances, he posted a 4.75 ERA.

He played his final game on September 9, 1959. The final batter he faced was Lee Maye. He was released two days after the 1959 season ended. In his time with the Pirates, he wore 16 again. With the Cubs, he wore 43. Overall, he posted an 87–97 career record with a 3.79 ERA and 1,567 innings of work. He was obviously not a strikeout pitcher-he posted just 572 Ks in his career (that is only about 3.3 per nine innings of work).

Career stats
He posted a .184 career batting average, although he did have two very successful seasons. In 98 at-bats in 1953, for example, he posted a .255 average with three home runs and sixteen RBI. His first career home run was a grand slam, which he hit on May 5 of that year. In 1956, he hit .326 in 43 at-bats. Overall, he hit six home runs in his career, driving in 43 runs. He stole one base in one chance. In the field, he committed 15 errors for a .960 fielding percentage. He was also involved in 15 double plays in his career.

Later life
After his career ended, he became a welder for the Westinghouse Corporation. In 1966, he received one vote for induction into the baseball Hall of Fame-obviously not enough to get him in. He died in 1980 in Charlotte, North Carolina, from lymphoma, at the age of 56. He is buried in Sharon Memorial Park in Charlotte. In 2005, Porterfield was inducted into the Virginia Sports Hall of Fame.

See also

 List of Major League Baseball annual wins leaders
 List of Major League Baseball annual shutout leaders
 Sporting News Pitcher of the Year Award

References

External links

The Deadball Era
Retrosheet

1923 births
1980 deaths
Major League Baseball pitchers
New York Yankees players
Washington Senators (1901–1960) players
Boston Red Sox players
Pittsburgh Pirates players
Chicago Cubs players
Baseball players from Virginia
American League All-Stars
American League wins champions
Deaths from lymphoma
Deaths from cancer in North Carolina
People from Giles County, Virginia
Radford Rockets players